Songs 2 may refer to:

 Songs 2 (Rich Mullins album), 1999
 Songs 2 (Judie Tzuke album), 2008

See also
 "Song 2", a 1997 song by Blur
 Song of Songs 2, or Song 2, the second chapter in the biblical book Song of Songs